"Someone Else's Trouble Now" is a song written by Pam Tillis and Gary Nicholson, and recorded by American country music band Highway 101.  It was released in September 1990 as the only single from their Greatest Hits compilation album.  The song reached number 14 on the Billboard Hot Country Singles & Tracks chart in December 1990.

Chart performance

References

1990 singles
1990 songs
Highway 101 songs
Warner Records singles
Songs written by Pam Tillis
Song recordings produced by Paul Worley
Songs written by Gary Nicholson